Jahnsson is a surname. Notable people with the surname include:

Jean Jahnsson (1854–1944), Swedish jeweller, art collector and Consul General
Kai Jahnsson (born 1965), Finnish sport shooter who competes in the men's 10 metre air pistol
Sirkka Jahnsson or Sirkka Sari (1920–1939), Finnish actress
Yrjö Jahnsson (1877–1936), Finnish economics professor at the University of Helsinki

See also
Yrjö Jahnsson Award
Yrjö Jahnsson Foundation
Janson
Jansson